Yonathan David Rodríguez Auyanet, commonly known as Yoni (born 19 March 1979 in Las Palmas, Canary Islands), is a Spanish footballer who plays for UD Vecindario as a forward.

External links
 
 Futbolme profile  
 
 

1979 births
Living people
Footballers from Las Palmas
Spanish footballers
Association football forwards
Segunda División B players
Tercera División players
UD Vecindario players
Primeira Liga players
Liga Portugal 2 players
Segunda Divisão players
Odivelas F.C. players
G.D. Estoril Praia players
C.F. Estrela da Amadora players
CS Pandurii Târgu Jiu players
Spanish expatriate footballers
Expatriate footballers in Portugal
Expatriate footballers in Romania